Cychrus koiwayai is a species of ground beetle in the subfamily of Carabinae. It was described by Deuve & Imura in 1993.

References

koiwayai
Beetles described in 1993